Livesey is a surname. Notable people with the surname include:

Bill Livesey, American baseball manager and executive
Charlie Livesey (1938–2005), footballer who played for Chelsea in Football League Division 1
Danny Livesey (born 1984), English football player
George Livesey (1834–1908), engineer, industrialist, namesake of the Livesey Hall War Memorial
Harry Livesey GBE (1860–1932), British civil engineer
Jeff Livesey (born 1966), American baseball player and coach
Joseph Livesey (1794–1884), temperance campaigner
Michael Livesey (born 1614), one of the regicides of King Charles I
Margot Livesey (born 1953), Scottish-born writer
Owen Livesey (born 1991), British judoka
Pete Livesey (1943–1998), rock-climber
Roger Livesey (1906–1976), Welsh stage and film actor
Tony Livesey (born 1964), British journalist and broadcaster

Fictional characters:
 Dr. Livesey (character), a fictional character in the novel Treasure Island, by Robert Louis Stevenson

See also
Livezey